Poecilanthrax arethusa is a species in the bee fly family Bombyliidae, found in Central and North America.

References

Bombyliidae
Articles created by Qbugbot
Insects described in 1886